The Yale Club of New York City, commonly called  The Yale Club, is a private club in Midtown Manhattan, New York City. Its membership is restricted almost entirely to alumni and faculty of Yale University. The Yale Club has a worldwide membership of over 11,000. The 22-story clubhouse at 50 Vanderbilt Avenue, opened in 1915, was the world's largest clubhouse upon its completion and is still the largest college clubhouse ever built.

Clubhouse

The club is located at 50 Vanderbilt Avenue, at the intersection of East 44th Street, across Vanderbilt Avenue from Grand Central Terminal and the MetLife Building. The clubhouse stands on Clubhouse Row, a block from the Harvard Club of New York at 27 West 44th, Penn Club of New York at 30 West 44th, New York Yacht Club at 37 West 44th, and Cornell Club of New York at 6 East 44th; and two blocks away from the Princeton Club of New York at 15 West 43rd (and Fifth Avenue) for inter-club events. The Yale Club shares its facility with the similar Dartmouth club (Columbia University shares a clubhouse with the Penn Club, while Brown shares the Cornell Club). The neighborhood is also home to the University Club of New York, and the flagship stores of J. Press and Paul Stuart, which traditionally catered to the club set. The building is a New York City-designated landmark.

The 22-story clubhouse contains three dining spaces (the "Tap Room," the "Grill Room," and the Roof Dining Room and Terrace), four bars (in the Tap Room, Grill Room, Main Lounge, and on the Roof Terrace), banquet rooms for up to 500 people (including the 20th-floor Grand Ballroom), 138 guest rooms, a library, a fitness and squash center with three international squash courts and a swimming pool, and a barber shop, among other amenities. The heart of the clubhouse is the main lounge, a large room with a high, ornate ceiling and large columns and walls lined with fireplaces and portraits of the five Yale-educated United States presidents, all of whom are or were members of the Yale Club: William Howard Taft, Gerald R. Ford, George H. W. Bush, Bill Clinton, and George W. Bush. Outside the lounge above the main staircase hangs a posthumous portrait of Elihu Yale by Francis Edwin Elwell and a portrait of Supreme Court Justice Sonia Sotomayor.

History

Early history
The Yale Club was created in 1897 by the Old Yale Alumni Association of New York, a 29-year-old organization that wanted a permanent clubhouse. One of the incorporators was Senator Chauncey Depew, whose 1890 portrait by the Swiss-born American artist Adolfo Müller-Ury hangs in the building. The first president of the Yale Club was attorney Thomas Thacher, founder of Simpson Thacher & Bartlett. The first clubhouse was a rented brownstone at 17 East 26th Street. In 1901, the club built a 12-story clubhouse at 30 West 44th Street, which today is home to the Penn Club of New York.

The current clubhouse opened in June 1915. Designed by architect and Yale alumnus James Gamble Rogers in conjunction with the construction of Grand Central Terminal, it was largely paid for by money raised or contributed by President George C. Ide of Brooklyn (whose portrait by George Burroughs Torrey hangs in the building). Its location was chosen because it was believed to be where Yale alumnus Nathan Hale was hanged by the British Army for espionage during the American Revolution, although the site of Hale's execution has more recently been disputed.

The Ken Burns documentary Prohibition said the Yale Club stocked sufficient liquor to see the club through the repeal of Prohibition in 1933.

21st century

In July 1999, the Yale Club became the first of New York's Ivy League university clubs to change its dress code to business casual, a move that upset some members and was received with polite scorn from other clubs. Today, the dress code remains business casual, except in the athletic facilities. In the fall of 2012, the club began to allow denim to be worn in the library, the Grill Room, and on the rooftop terrace during the summer, but nowhere else, as long as it is "neat, clean, and in good repair."

Following the September 11 attacks in 2001, the Heisman Trophy, traditionally presented at the Downtown Athletic Club, was presented at the Yale Club in 2002 and 2003. The 2002 winner was quarterback Carson Palmer of the USC Trojans, and the 2003 winner was quarterback Jason White of the University of Oklahoma Sooners. Before the two Heisman Trophy ceremonies, the un-awarded trophy itself was displayed in the Yale Club's lobby, flanked by portraits of Yale's two Heisman winners, end Larry Kelley (1936) and halfback Clint Frank (1937).

In June 2007, former United States Solicitor General and onetime Supreme Court nominee Robert Bork sued the club in federal court. Bork alleged that, while trying to reach the dais to speak at an event for The New Criterion magazine, he fell because the club negligently failed to provide steps or a handrail between the floor and the dais.  Bork claimed that his injuries required surgery, immobilized him for months, forced him to use a cane, and left him with a limp. He sought judgment for $1 million in damages plus punitive damages and attorney's fees. In May 2008, Bork and the club reached a confidential, out-of-court settlement.

Membership

To be eligible membership, a candidate must be an alumnus/alumna, faculty member, full-time graduate student of Yale University, or a child of one. The club sends out a monthly newsletter to members.

Yale College did not allow women to become members until 1969. Wives of members had to enter the club through a separate entrance (today the service entrance), and were not allowed to have access to much of the clubhouse. Once Yale opened to women, however, the club quickly followed suit on July 30, 1969, although the club did not open its bar, dining room, or athletic facilities to women until 1974 and did not open its swimming pool (known as "the plunge") to women until 1987. Now, women constitute a large percentage of the club's membership.

Three other, smaller clubs also are in residence at the Yale Club: the Dartmouth Club, the Virginia Club, and the Delta Kappa Epsilon Club. Members of these other clubs have the same access to the clubhouse and its facilities as members of the Yale Club itself.

According to a book published for the club's 1997 centennial, members at that time included George H. W. Bush, Hillary Clinton, Bill Clinton, Gerald Ford, John Kerry and George Pataki. Among others were architect Cesar Pelli and author David McCullough. Today, the Yale Club has over 11,000 members worldwide.

In 1972, Frank Mankiewicz famously described John Lindsay as "the only populist in history who plays squash at the Yale Club."

See also
Columbia University Club of New York
Cornell Club of New York
Harvard Club of Boston
Harvard Club of New York
Penn Club of New York City
Princeton Club of New York
 List of New York City Designated Landmarks in Manhattan from 14th to 59th Streets

References
Notes

External links

 Yale Club of New York City
 History of the Yale Club 

1897 establishments in New York City
Clubhouses in Manhattan
Clubs and societies in Manhattan
Culture of New York City
New York City Designated Landmarks in Manhattan
Midtown Manhattan
Organizations established in 1897
Sports venues completed in 1915
Squash venues in the United States
Gentlemen's clubs in New York City
Yale University